Cherryvale is an unincorporated community in Vigo and Clay counties, in the U.S. state of Indiana.

It is part of the Terre Haute metropolitan area.

History
Cherryvale was not formally laid out or platted. A post office was established at Cherryvale in 1899, and remained in operation until it was discontinued in 1904.

Geography
Cherryvale is located in western Clay County adjacent to the Vigo-Clay county line approximately one mile north of I-70.

References

Unincorporated communities in Indiana
Unincorporated communities in Clay County, Indiana
Unincorporated communities in Vigo County, Indiana
Terre Haute metropolitan area